Beach sepak takraw at the 2012 Asian Beach Games was held from 16 June to 22 June 2012 in Haiyang, China.

Medalists

Medal table

Results

Men's regu

Preliminary round

Group A

Group B

Knockout round

Men's team regu

Women's regu

Women's team regu

References
 Official website

2012 Asian Beach Games events
2012